Candace Lee (born July 12, 1984) is an American retired female volleyball player. She was part of the United States women's national volleyball team.

Personal life

Lee attended high school at Winston Churchill High School. She was a top 11 student in her graduating class with a 4.0 GPA. She played both volleyball and tennis in high school.

Career

College

Lee played collegiate volleyball for Washington, where she was named an AVCA Second Team All-American her senior year. By the time she ended her collegiate career, she became Washington's all-time career digs leader (2,038), which ranked second on the Pac-10 all-time list.

National team

Lee competed among others at the 2006 Women's Pan-American Volleyball Cup and also at the 2006 FIVB World Grand Prix and 2007 FIVB World Grand Prix.

References

External links
 Profile at FIVB.org

1984 births
Living people
American women's volleyball players
Sportspeople from Colorado Springs, Colorado
Washington Huskies women's volleyball players
Liberos
People from Eugene, Oregon
University of Washington alumni
Winston Churchill High School (Eugene, Oregon) alumni